is a Japanese video game developer founded on June 2, 2006 as a subsidiary of Idea Factory. The company was formerly managed by Compile's former executive Masamitsu "Moo" Niitani, most well known as the creator of the Madou Monogatari and Puyo Puyo series, before his retirement in December 2012. Compile Heart is primarily known for its Hyperdimension Neptunia and Record of Agarest War brands.

As of 2010, the company managed to acquire a licensing deal with D4 Enterprise (the copyright holder of most property rights under Compile) to create new video games based on franchises from the defunct developer. This does not affect the rights to the Puyo Puyo series which D4 does not own and remains the property of Sega.

Games 

 CH Selection (Compile Heart Selection) is similar to "The Best" (JP) or "Greatest Hits" (US), but use specially for Compile Heart's games.

Projects
Compile Heart has announced a project titled Galapagos RPG, that aims to create new RPGs with a Japanese style, aimed towards Japanese gamers. The first game from this project is a "Fantasy RPG" with a dark tone called Fairy Fencer F for the PlayStation 3 followed respectively by Omega Quintet, Fairy Fencer F: Advent Dark Force, Death end re;Quest, Dragon Star Varnir, Arc of Alchemist, and Death end re;Quest 2 for the PlayStation 4.

Notes

References

External links

 

Video game companies established in 2006
Video game companies of Japan
Video game development companies
Japanese companies established in 2006